Myristica yunnanensis is a species of plant in the family Myristicaceae. It is found in southern Yunnan, China, northern Thailand, and in Thanh Hóa Province, Vietnam.

At the time of the latest IUCN assessment in 1998, Myristica yunnanensis was only known from about 20 trees in two localities in Xishuangbanna in Yunnan; it was assessed as "Critically Endangered". However, later it has been found to have a somewhat broader distribution reaching Thailand and Vietnam too. The Vietnamese record is from the Bến En National Park.

References

yunnanensis
Critically endangered plants
Trees of China
Trees of Thailand
Trees of Vietnam
Taxonomy articles created by Polbot
Plants described in 1976